The M117 is an air-dropped demolition bomb used by United States military forces. The weapon dates back to the Korean War of the early 1950s. Demolition bombs rely on time delayed fuzes which allow the bomb to burrow into a building or other structure before detonating. The M117 can be configured with a conical low-drag tail for medium and high altitude deliveries or a high-drag tail fin for low-altitude drops, delaying the bombs hitting their targets ensuring fighters are out of the blast zone before detonation. The M117 was the basis for the BOLT-117, the world's first Laser-guided bomb.

History
From the 1950s through the early 1970s the M117 was a standard aircraft weapon, carried by the F-100 Super Sabre, F-104 Starfighter, F-105 Thunderchief, B-57 Canberra, F-111, F-5, A-1 Skyraider, A-4 Skyhawk and F-4 Phantom. The M117 series was used extensively during the Vietnam War, and B-52G Stratofortress aircraft dropped 44,600 M117 and M117R bombs during Operation Desert Storm.

The B-52 Stratofortress was the last aircraft to use the bomb; tactical aircraft had mostly switched to using the Mark 80-series bombs, particularly the Mark 82 or Mark 84 bombs and their guided equivalents. On 26 June 2015, the last Mk 117 in PACAF inventory was dropped by a B-52H crew on an island near Andersen AFB, Guam.

Variants
M117A1
The M117A1 is essentially the same bomb as the M117 with the exception of the following components which have been removed: center lug, two spring washers utilized to hold the electrical fuzes in the nose and base and a ring receptacle lock utilized in the electrical fuze cable assembly.
M117A1E1

M117A1E2
The M117A1E2 is identical to the M117A1 with the exception that the explosive filler Minol II() is used instead of Tritonal. Minol II was used in an effort to offset the shortages of TNT in the late 1960s, however, problems developed during the storage of M117 bombs filled with Minol II, especially in hot, tropical areas which caused the explosive filler to expand and ooze or extrude through the joints of the bomb. While determined safe to handle, the extruded material required maintainers to clean the bombs before transportation or usage. The U.S. Navy refused to use M117 bombs with the Minol II filler citing, "Because of the proximity of crew quarters to the ships’ magazines where explosives are stored and the necessity of handling ordnance on rolling and pitching vessels, the Navy has regarded Minol II as being a potential hazard to the safety of its ships ’ crews and thus has not approved its use aboard ship."
M117A1E3

M117A2

M117A3

M117D
The M117D (D - Destructor) looks similar to the M117R but uses a magnetic influence fuze, which enables the bomb to function as a mine. The M117D is released in a high-drag configuration for a ground implant or shallow water mining. It detonates when an object passing near the bomb triggers the fuze.
M117R
The M117R (R - Retarded) uses a special fin assembly providing either high-drag or low-drag release options. For low altitude deliveries, the tail assembly opens four large drag plates which rapidly slow the bomb and allow the aircraft to escape its blast.
MC-1
The M117 was the basis of the MC-1 chemical warfare bomb, which had the body cavity filled with sarin nerve gas. The MC-1 was never used by the U.S. in combat and was eliminated from the U.S. stockpile in June, 2006.

Tail Assemblies
BSU-85/B
 Air-inflatable retarder
BSU-93/B
 Air-inflatable retarder
M131/M131A1
 Early low-drag conical tail assembly utilized for high-altitude bomb drops.
MAU-91A/B
 High-drag tail assembly utilized to drastically reduce the free-fall speed of the M117 and when utilized in low-level bombing, allowed fighter aircraft sufficient time to clear the blast area before bomb detonation. M117 bombs utilizing this style tail assembly were designated M117R.
MAU-103A/B
 Low-drag conical tail assembly which began service with the M117 in the 1970s.

References

 Arsenal of Democracy II, Tom Gervasi, 
 Janes Air Launched Weapons Issue 36,

External links

 OAI.DTIC.mil: Finned/Retared BLU-1B/C Version Tested
 VectorSite.net: Smart Bombs and Dumb DBombs

Cold War aerial bombs of the United States
Aerial bombs of the United States
Military equipment introduced in the 1950s